'The Sale and purchase of ship' is one of the important aspects of the shipping industry. It involves vast amounts of money (in excess of 100 million US Dollars) and requires different kinds of professional knowledge, such as knowledge of particular type of ship and its function, legal knowledge as well as dealing and bargaining knowledge. In order to reduce the number of disputes and smoothen the sale and purchase procedure, normally the shipowner (seller) and the buyer will appoint brokers as middlemen to handle the transaction. There are three main stages for the sale and purchase of a ship which include (1) the negotiation and contract stage, (2) the inspections stage and (3) the completion. From different stages, it includes different important issues and regulations. In following, the article will discuss all these stages of Sale and Purchase of a ship and all the important elements.

Negotiation and contract stage 

The negotiation and contract stage are the first two steps of the sale of a ship. They are normally carried out by the brokers appointed by both buyer and seller. Initially, the broker of the buyer will make the telex exchange with the seller's brokers to make an invitation to offer. The main concerns of both parties at this stage are the pricing, the particulars of the ship and the lay-days of the transaction.

After this approach, both parties will have the price bargaining and negotiations of the main terms of contract. If the basic terms are agreed upon by both parties, a recap telex which recaps the terms discussed will be exchanged, subject to details to be agreed later. With the recap telex, both parties can further discuss and bargain the main terms of contracts.

After all the details are agreed through numerous communications, a formal contract for the sale of ship - Memorandum of Agreement (MOA) - will be drawn up. There are some standard form contracts for the MOA like the Norwegian Sale Form (NSF). However, there are  times the contract may be subject to some conditions such as obtaining approvals from directors or shareholders, or licences. After drawing the sales form, 10 percent of the deposit will be paid by the buyer and the buyer can appoint his own surveyor to inspect the ship.

Inspections stage 

After the forming of contract, it will enter to the inspection stage. There are two major parts in the inspections stage which include the documents inspection and the physical inspection of the ship afloat. For the documents inspection, the buyer will check the ship's class records and certificate records. The inspection of records will reveal the history of the ship's maintenance and compliance with the requirement of class. Furthermore, the buyer also should check the mortgages records and the maritime lien records to prevent any damages or loss subject to the legal issue of the ship which occurred before the delivery of the ship. For the physical inspection, checks are usually made to the surface of the ship and its logbook, unless otherwise agreed.

It is preferable to hire a surveyor from any reputed company to inspect the vessel for all safety, certificates, equipments, engine issues etc.  A sea trial is advisable.

Completion 

The final stage of sale and purchase is known as completion stage. It involves pre-delivery matters including inspection of underwater parts by the classification society, delivery of documents and the physical delivery of the ship upon payment of the balance of the contract price. Such underwater inspections can be done at the buyer's request in which case if it is not required by the Classification Society's surveyor the due charges will be on the buyer's account.

For the Documents and Physical delivery, it usually occurs in different places depending on the location of the ship. The final inspection of underwater parts is located in the drydock of the port of delivery. To obtain the certificate of class with regards to the safety, a survey of the ship's bottom and underwater parts is conducted by the surveyor of the classification society. The surveyor may make recommendations for the repairing of ship which affect the expense of the seller before delivery. Sometimes, the buyer may appoint his own surveyor, who must be approved by the classification society, to carry out the underwater inspection while the ship is afloat.

For the final closing of transaction, the MOA specifies some necessary procedures. Some documents are required which include the closing memo, minutes of meeting of the seller's directors and shareholders, a certificate of good standing, a power of attorney, the bill of sale, certificate of class, any consents or licenses required by the government authority, a certificate by the registrar of the ship's registry permitting the sale.

Furthermore, the seller should arrange the deletion of his name from the registry and deletion of the existing flag if the buyer wants to change the flag. Also, cancellation of the insurance cover, settlement of mortgage and repatriation of crew should also be made ready by the seller. When the seller is ready, an advance notice of delivery - Notice of Readiness- will be serviced to the buyer and the buyer will arrange the payment of fuel or "bunkers" and stores on board and instruct his bank to make the payment on the actual delivery date.

Protection of buyer 

There are some clauses under the sales form protecting the interest of the buyer of ship. For example, clause 9 of Sale Form 1993 has provided some limited protection for the buyer. Under the clause 9, the seller warrants that the vessel is free from all charters, encumbrances, mortgages and maritime liens or any other debts whatsoever at the time of delivery. The buyer can claim against the seller for all consequences of claims make against the vessel which have been incurred prior to the time of delivery. If the ship cannot settle down all the mortgages and other claim attached to the ship before the delivery, the buyer can discharge the purchase price to cover this part of claim. Normally, the buyer would also retain part of the payment for around six months to secure there is no any claims and Maritime Liens of the ship.

However, it is difficult for the buyer to terminate the contract even if the vessel still has some encumbrances, mortgages or maritime liens at the time of delivery. Under the English law, the "warranty" is a contractual promise which is not the condition of the contract, so the innocent party can only claim damages but not terminate the contract if there is breach of warranty. Thus, it is difficult for the buyer to terminate the contract.

Procedure to terminate the contract 

To terminate the sales and purchase contract, there are two main procedures and the buyer must follow these steps:

Firstly, the buyer should put a notice to inform the seller that there is an encumbrance he/she is aware of and, secondly, the buyer should seek clarification on seller's intention with regard to the encumbrance by specifically referring to Seller's obligations under clause 9 of Sale Form 1993.
  
If, after the buyer taking the above two steps, the seller fails to remove all the encumbrance in time, the buyer will be entitled to terminate the contract.

Remedies of seller 

Under the Sale of Goods Act 1979 s.41, the seller is entitled to exercise a possessory lien over the vessel until payment by the buyer. Also, the seller is entitled to resell the vessel to another buyer if the buyer fails to settle the payment in time. An unpaid seller may bring an action to recover the sale cost where the buyer has acquired the property in the ship but refuses or fails to pay the price.

Remedies of Buyer 

Under the Sale of Goods Act 1979 s.51, the buyer is entitled to take action for non-delivery of the ship and claim for damages. For the delay of delivery, the buyer can claim for the difference in value of the vessel if the price to buy the other vessel instant is different. Also, the buyer can terminate the contract and claim for damages if the vessel is not delivered after a certain period.

Duties of the seller 

Fundamentally, the main duty of the seller is to deliver the ship in accordance with the terms, conditions and warranties of the contract. The time of delivery may or may not be an essential part of the contract depending on the clause of the contract. If time is of the essence, the buyer can have the option to cancel the contract when delivery is not made by the stipulated date.

Furthermore, the seller also has the obligation to avoid misrepresentation. Although there is no general duty of disclosure and the buyer is free to onboard inspections on the vessel to be purchased, the seller should not induce the other party to enter into the contract by making material representations which are untrue. Statements or assurances made during negotiations leading to a contract may be either "terms" which form the express terms of the contract or just the statements which do not intend to be part of the contract, but help to induce the contract. Even if the statement is not "Misrepresentation", it is difficult for the buyer to claim for remedies if this misrepresentation does not become a contractual term.

Duties of the buyer 

The main duty of the buyer is paying the agreed purchase price of the vessel. Normally, the time of payment is not the essential factor unless there is an express clause in the contract. The buyer must also accept delivery under the Sale of Goods Act 1979, s27. It is provided under s27, that payment and delivery should be concurrent unless otherwise stipulated. Of course, the buyer also has the obligations to prevent misrepresentation during the negotiation stage.

Conclusion 

The sale and purchase of ship is one of the most complicated procedures in the shipping industry - far more complicated compared to a new building contract of a ship for example. The S&P contract involves different kinds of professional knowledge as well as strong negotiation skills. Furthermore, due to the legal effect raised by the Maritime liens attach to the second-hand ship, the buyer should check the history and any court writs to reduce any future loss from the purchased ship. Thus, with regard to the complicated issues of this market, a professional shipbroker takes an important role during the transaction.

External links
 Ships For sale

References 

1. Aleka M.(2001), Modern Admiralty Law with Risk management Aspects, Cavendish Publishing limited, London.

2. Hill, C. (1998), Maritime Law, 5th ed, LLP Reference Publishing, London.

3. Simon B. (2001), Shipping Law, 2nd ed, Cavendish Publishing limited, London.

Ship management
Admiralty law